Captain's Wafers is an American brand of crackers that is made by Lance Inc. They are light buttery crackers typically served with soups and salads. They are mentioned specifically in the song "Camel Walk" by Southern Culture on the Skids.  Captain's Wafers' most notable claim to fame is winning the North Dakota "Best Cracker in Show" contest for 14 consecutive years.

According to David Beard, the director of training at Lance, Inc., the name of the Captain's Wafers came from the idea that "on a ship, the captains always had the best of everything when it came to meals. So the name Captain's Wafers was used to show they were the very best wafers."

The name was submitted by Joe M. Logan, (executive vice president of sales and marketing at Lance, retired from Lance in 1975). Mr. Logan had returned from World War II service in the South Pacific with the US Army's 7th Infantry Division in 1946. It was his experience on board a merchant vessel going home, during which he was asked to dine at the Captain's table, that produced the idea for the crackers' name.

Sandwich cracker varieties 

Cream Cheese & Chives on Captain's Wafers
Peanut Butter with Honey on Captain's Wafers
Grilled Cheese on Captain's Wafers
Captain's Choice Variety Pack
Four Cheese on Captain's Wafers
Jalapeño Cheddar
Squirrel Pie
BOLDS Buffalo Ranch
BOLDS Smokehouse Cheddar

References

External links 
 
 Captain's Wafers nutritional data

Brand name crackers
Lance Inc. brands